Tetraethylmethane is a branched alkane with 9 carbon atoms.  It is a highly flammable and volatile liquid at room temperature. It is one of the isomers of nonane.

References

See 
Neopentane

External links
 

Alkanes